Viticulture is the science, production, and study of grapes. This is a list of notable viticulturists:

A
Nicole Abiouness, American female entrepreneur and winemaker
John Adlum, American viticulturist who was the first to cultivate the Catawba grape
Mary Anderson, American female real estate developer, rancher, and viticulturist
Fabio Asquini, Italian economist and winemaker

B
Christine Barbe, French female winemaker, in California
Bo Barrett, American male winemaker of Chateau Montelena and son of Jim Barrett
Heidi Barrett, American winemaker and entrepreneur known for California's cult wines, also wife of Bo Barrett
Jim Barrett (winemaker), American winemaker and former owner of Chateau Montelena
Helmut Becker, German viticulturist and former chief of the Geisenheim Grape Breeding Institute
Andy Beckstoffer, California vineyard owner
Eleanor Berwick, English wine grower in Suffolk
Heinrich Birk, German viticulturist and former chief of the Geisenheim Grape Breeding Institute
Jean-Charles Boisset, French winemaker and the proprietor of the Boisset Collection
Henri Bouschet, French viticulturist
Romeo Bragato, wine personality who played a significant role in the development of the wine industry in Australia and New Zealand
Gustavo Brambila, Mexican-American winemaker in the Napa Valley
Isidor Bush, Jewish publisher and viticulturist.

C
Joseph Bernard Chambers, New Zealand sheep farmer, viticulturist and winemaker
Adhémar de Chaunac, French-born Canadian wine pioneer
Francis Ford Coppola, American film director, producer, screenwriter, and winemaker
Assid Abraham Corban, New Zealand peddler, importer, viticulturist, and wine-maker
Cathy Corison, American winemaker, entrepreneur, and consultant
Phil Coturri,  American viticulturist and vineyard manager
Auguste Courtiller, French paleontologist and viticulturist

D

John Bernard Philip Humbert, 9th Count de Salis-Soglio, British soldier, lawyer, and winemaker

F

Peter Fanucchi, Californian winegrower
Ernest Ferroul, French physician, politician, and a leader of the 1907 revolt of the Languedoc winegrowers
Maurice Fontaine, French politician and viticulturist
Konstantin Frank, a viticulturist and winemaker in New York
Barbara Funkhouser, American journalist, newspaper editor, writer and vineyard operator
Elizabeth Furse, American politician and small business owner

G

Dave Godfrey
Sir David Graaff, 3rd Baronet
Wharton J. Green
Mike Grgich

H

Victor Davis Hanson
Agoston Haraszthy
August Herold
Theodore Erasmus Hilgard
Terry Hoage

J

Mathieson Jacoby
Hermann Jaeger
Sally Johnson, Americah female winemaker
Kathy Joseph
Hans Otto Jung

K

James King (pioneer)
Mia Klein
Géza Krepuska

L

Leo Laliman
Anna Larroucau Laborde de Lucero
Pauline Lhote
Nicholas Longworth (winemaker)
Louis Lucas
Giorgio Lungarotti

M

William Macarthur
Marcelin Albert
Henri Marès
Paul Masson
Fritz Maytag
Philippe Melka
Carole Meredith
Marshall Dawson Miller
Constantin Mimi
Robert Mondavi
Jacques Augustin Mourgue
Hermann Müller (Thurgau)
Thomas Volney Munson

N

Henry Morris Naglee

O

Nello Olivo

P

Mary Penfold
Abraham Izak Perold
Ben Pon

R

Benoît Raclet
Rashbam
Pierre Richard
Charles Rosen (scientist)
Alphonse James de Rothschild
Ariane de Rothschild
Benjamin de Rothschild
David René de Rothschild
Édouard Alphonse James de Rothschild
Édouard de Rothschild
James Mayer de Rothschild
Nathaniel de Rothschild
Philippe de Rothschild

S

Charles Saalmann
Pierre Sainsevain
Guy Salisbury-Jones
Otto Schneider-Orelli
Albert Seibel
Richard Smart (viticulturalist)
John Summerskill
Elmer Swenson

T

Pierre Taittinger
William Thompson (viticulturist)
Helen Turley, American winemaker

V

Elizabeth Vianna
Jean-Louis Vignes

W

Gil Wahlquist, Australian pioneer organic winemaker
John Carl Warnecke
Martin Weinek
Warren Winiarski
Friedrich Wohnsiedler
John Reid Wolfskill
William Wolfskill

Z

Phyllis Zouzounis, American female winemaker known for Zinfandel wine
Fritz Zweigelt, Austrian botanist, entomologist and grapevine breeder

==

Viticulturists